Thor Island is the largest of a group of small islands lying at the east side of Foyn Harbor in Wilhelmina Bay, off the west coast of Graham Land. The island was named South Thor Island by whalers in 1921-22 because the whaling factory Thor I was moored to it during that season (the island to the northeast was called North Thor Island). In 1960 the United Kingdom Antarctic Place-Names Committee (UK-APC) limited the name Thor to the island actually used by the ship; the other island was left unnamed.

See also 
 List of Antarctic and sub-Antarctic islands
 

Islands of Graham Land